Moataz Yaseen Mahjoub Al-Fityani (born 3 November 1982) is a Jordanian footballer who plays as a goalkeeper for Al-Salt and the Jordan national football team.

Club career
Moataz first began his career as a defender until the age of 15 when he then changed to becoming a goalkeeper.

International career
Moataz played his first international match against Bahrain in an international friendly on 3 June 2009, which Jordan lost 4-0.

International career statistics

Honours

Shabab Al-Ordon
AFC Cup (1): 2007
Jordan Premier League (2): 2005–06, 2012–13
Jordan FA Cup (2): 2005–06, 2006–07
Jordan FA Shield (1): 2007
Jordan Super Cup (2): 2007, 2013

Al-Faisaly
Jordan Premier League (1): 2016–17
Jordan FA Cup (1): 2016–17

Personal life and family
Moataz's father Yaseen is a former coach of the Jordan national boxing team, and has a brother named Mahmoud who used to play as a goalkeeper for Al-Wehdat. Moataz is married and has a son named Ayham.

References

External links
 
 
 
 Moataz Yaseen at SoccerPunter.com

1982 births
Living people
Jordanian footballers
Jordan international footballers
Jordanian people of Palestinian descent
Jordanian Pro League players
Association football goalkeepers
2011 AFC Asian Cup players
2015 AFC Asian Cup players
Al-Faisaly SC players
Al-Salt SC players
That Ras Club players
Shabab Al-Ordon Club players
Al-Ahli SC (Amman) players
Sportspeople from Amman
2019 AFC Asian Cup players